Pál Koczka (22 March 1939 – 2 June 2016) was a Hungarian basketball player. He competed in the men's tournament at the 1964 Summer Olympics.

References

1939 births
2016 deaths
Hungarian men's basketball players
Olympic basketball players of Hungary
Basketball players at the 1964 Summer Olympics
Basketball players from Budapest